Roger Christian Hansen (born August 28, 1961) is an American former professional baseball player and a former professional baseball coach. Hansen primarily played catcher during his playing career, but also played first base and third base on occasion. Before his current assignment with the Mariners, he was a catching consultant in their organization. Over his playing career, Hansen played for the rookie-level GCL Royals (1980), the Class-A Charleston Royals (1981–1982), the Class-A Fort Myers Royals (1983), the Double-A Jacksonville Suns (1983), the Double-A Memphis Chicks (1984–1985), the Triple-A Omaha Royals (1985–1986), the Double-A Chattanooga Lookouts (1987), the Double-A Vermont Mariners (1988), the Double-A Williamsport Bills and the Triple-A Calgary Cannons (1988, 1989). Hansen has never played in Major League Baseball.

Professional career

Playing career
Hansen was drafted by the Kansas City Royals in the second round of the 1980 Major League Baseball Draft out of Rio Mesa High School in Oxnard, California. He began his professional career with the rookie-level GCL Royals. In 55 games, Hansen batted .228 with 38 hit, three doubles and two triples. In 1981, Hansen was promoted to the Class-A Charleston Royals where he batted .242 with 125 hits, 28 doubles, six triples and six home runs in 141 games played. During the next season, 1982, Hansen continued playing with the Charleston Royals. He batted .282 with 78 runs, 148 hits, 34 doubles, 15 home runs and 94 runs batted in (RBIs) in 137 games played that season. He was second in the South Atlantic League in doubles that year. Hansen's 1983 season was split between the Class-A Fort Myers Royals and the Double-A Jacksonville Suns. With Fort Myers, he batted .282 with 51 runs, 109 hits, 13 doubles, one triple, two home runs and 62 RBIs in 107 games. In one game with the Suns, Hansen got one hit in four at-bats. Hansen spent his 1984 season at the Double-A level with the Memphis Chicks of the Southern League. In 93 games, Hansen batted .217 with 71 hits, 10 doubles and three home runs. He continued playing with the Memphis Chicks in 1985, but received a promotion to the Triple-A Omaha Royals late in the season. Hansen batted .324 with 68 hits, 10 doubles and two home runs in 66 games between the two teams. In 1986, Hansen spent the entire season with the Omaha Royals. He batted .253 with 49 hits, five doubles and four home runs in 73 games.

Before the 1987 season, Hansen joined the Seattle Mariners organization and was assigned to the Double-A Chattanooga Lookouts for the season. In 98 games, Hansen batted .281 with 94 hits, 12 doubles, one triple and five home runs. During the 1988 season, Hansen played at the Double-A and Triple-A level. First, with the Double-A Vermont Mariners, Hansen batted .301 with 31 hits, two doubles, one triple and one one home run in 34 games. With the Triple-A Calgary Cannons, he batted .250 with 39 hits, six doubles and two home runs in 51 games. During that season, Hansen's friend, Kurt Stillwell, compared Hansen to Crash Davis from the movie Bull Durham. Hansen spent his final season as a player in 1989 with the Double-A Williamsport Bills and the Triple-A Calgary Cannons. In 122 combined games between the two teams, he batted .205 with 25 hits and five doubles.

Coaching career
In 1992, Hansen joined the Seattle Mariners as a bullpen coach. The Mariners' team earned run average was 4.55 that season and the team went 64–98 positioning them seventh in the American League West. Hansen was fired at the end of the season along with the rest of the Mariners' coaching staff. In 1996, Hansen was hired as the manager of the Class-A Short Season Everett AquaSox in the Mariners' organization. Hansen was hired as a roving catching instructor for the Orix BlueWave in Japan's Pacific League. He re-joined the Mariners' organization in 2002 as a coach with the Everett AquaSox. Hansen managed the AquaSox for the last 28 games of the 2002 season. In 2003, he was named the Mariners' minor-league catching coordinator. On August 10, 2010, the Mariners fired members of their coaching staff, including bench coach Ty Van Burkleo, and Hansen was hired to take over that position on an interim basis.

Personal
Hansen was born on August 28, 1961, in Johnstown, Pennsylvania. He resides in Stanwood, Washington with his wife Lynn and their two children.

Footnotes
 All team's listed under "as player" and "as manager" are minor league baseball teams.

References
General references

Inline citations

External links

1961 births
Living people
American expatriate baseball people in Japan
American expatriate baseball players in Canada
Baseball coaches from Pennsylvania
Baseball players from Pennsylvania
Calgary Cannons players
Charleston Royals players
Chattanooga Lookouts players
Fort Myers Royals players
Gulf Coast Royals players
Jacksonville Suns players
Memphis Chicks players
Minor league baseball managers
Nippon Professional Baseball coaches
Omaha Royals players
Orix BlueWave
People from Stanwood, Washington
Seattle Mariners coaches
Seattle Mariners scouts
Sportspeople from Johnstown, Pennsylvania
Vermont Mariners players
Williamsport Bills players